The Delegation of the European Union to Moldova was established to facilitate relations between Moldova and the European Union. It is located in Moldova's capital, Chișinău.

History 

The European Commission opened up a new office in Moldova on October 6, 2005 headed by Cesare de Montis. The interim President of Moldova, Mihai Ghimpu, awarded the Honour Order to Cesare de Montis in October 2009 at the end of his mandate in Moldova.

The Head of the European Union Delegation to Moldova has been Ambassador Dirk Steffen Schuebel since November 2009. Before, Dirk Schuebel was the Deputy Head of the Delegation of the European Commission to Ukraine.

In April 2013, the appointment of Pirkka Tapiola as new Head of the EU Delegation to Moldova was announced. Tapilola was followed in 2017 by Peter Michalko, who in turn was followed by Janis Mazeiks in 2021.

The Delegation of the European Union to Moldova is located at 12 Kogălniceanu Street, in Central Chișinău.

See also
 Moldova–European Union relations

External links 
 Official Site

References

Moldova–European Union relations
European Union
Diplomatic missions of the European Union
Buildings and structures in Chișinău